Hyperthyroidism is the condition that occurs due to excessive production of thyroid hormones by the thyroid gland. Thyrotoxicosis is the condition that occurs due to excessive thyroid hormone of any cause and therefore includes hyperthyroidism. Some, however, use the terms interchangeably. Signs and symptoms vary between people and may include irritability, muscle weakness, sleeping problems, a fast heartbeat, heat intolerance, diarrhea, enlargement of the thyroid, hand tremor, and weight loss. Symptoms are typically less severe in the elderly and during pregnancy. An uncommon complication is thyroid storm in which an event such as an infection results in worsening symptoms such as confusion and a high temperature and often results in death. The opposite is hypothyroidism, when the thyroid gland does not make enough thyroid hormone.

Graves' disease is the cause of about 50% to 80% of the cases of hyperthyroidism in the United States. Other causes include multinodular goiter, toxic adenoma, inflammation of the thyroid, eating too much iodine, and too much synthetic thyroid hormone. A less common cause is a pituitary adenoma. The diagnosis may be suspected based on signs and symptoms and then confirmed with blood tests. Typically blood tests show a low thyroid stimulating hormone (TSH) and raised T3 or T4. Radioiodine uptake by the thyroid, thyroid scan, and TSI antibodies may help determine the cause.

Treatment depends partly on the cause and severity of disease. There are three main treatment options: radioiodine therapy, medications, and thyroid surgery. Radioiodine therapy involves taking iodine-131 by mouth which is then concentrated in and destroys the thyroid over weeks to months. The resulting hypothyroidism is treated with synthetic thyroid hormone. Medications such as beta blockers may control the symptoms, and anti-thyroid medications such as methimazole may temporarily help people while other treatments are having an effect. Surgery to remove the thyroid is another option. This may be used in those with very large thyroids or when cancer is a concern. In the United States hyperthyroidism affects about 1.2% of the population. It occurs between two and ten times more often in women. Onset is commonly between 20 and 50 years of age. Overall the disease is more common in those over the age of 60 years.

Signs and symptoms

Hyperthyroidism may be asymptomatic or present with significant symptoms. Some of the symptoms of hyperthyroidism include nervousness, irritability, increased perspiration, heart racing, hand tremors, anxiety, trouble sleeping, thinning of the skin, fine brittle hair, and muscular weakness—especially in the upper arms and thighs. More frequent bowel movements may occur, and diarrhea is common. Weight loss, sometimes significant, may occur despite a good appetite (though 10% of people with a hyperactive thyroid experience weight gain), vomiting may occur, and, for women, menstrual flow may lighten and menstrual periods may occur less often, or with longer cycles than usual.

Thyroid hormone is critical to normal function of cells. In excess, it both overstimulates metabolism and disrupts the normal functioning of sympathetic nervous system, causing "speeding up" of various body systems and symptoms resembling an overdose of epinephrine (adrenaline). These include fast heartbeat and symptoms of palpitations, nervous system tremor such as of the hands and anxiety symptoms, digestive system hypermotility, unintended weight loss, and, in lipid panel blood tests, a lower and sometimes unusually low serum cholesterol.

Major clinical signs of hyperthyroidism include weight loss (often accompanied by an increased appetite), anxiety, heat intolerance, hair loss (especially of the outer third of the eyebrows), muscle aches, weakness, fatigue, hyperactivity, irritability, high blood sugar, excessive urination, excessive thirst, delirium, tremor, pretibial myxedema (in Graves' disease), emotional lability, and sweating.  Panic attacks, inability to concentrate, and memory problems may also occur. Psychosis and paranoia, common during thyroid storm, are rare with milder hyperthyroidism. Many persons will experience complete remission of symptoms 1 to 2 months after a euthyroid state is obtained, with a marked reduction in anxiety, sense of exhaustion, irritability, and depression. Some individuals may have an increased rate of anxiety or persistence of affective and cognitive symptoms for several months to up to 10 years after a euthyroid state is established. In addition, those with hyperthyroidism may present with a variety of physical symptoms such as palpitations and abnormal heart rhythms (the notable ones being atrial fibrillation), shortness of breath (dyspnea), loss of libido, amenorrhea, nausea, vomiting, diarrhea, gynecomastia and feminization. Long term untreated hyperthyroidism can lead to osteoporosis. These classical symptoms may not be present often in the elderly.

Neurological manifestations can include tremors, chorea, myopathy, and in some susceptible individuals (in particular of Asian descent) periodic paralysis. An association between thyroid disease and myasthenia gravis has been recognized. Thyroid disease, in this condition, is autoimmune in nature and approximately 5% of people with myasthenia gravis also have hyperthyroidism. Myasthenia gravis rarely improves after thyroid treatment and the relationship between the two entities is not well understood.

In Graves' disease, ophthalmopathy may cause the eyes to look enlarged because the eye muscles swell and push the eye forward. Sometimes, one or both eyes may bulge. Some have swelling of the front of the neck from an enlarged thyroid gland (a goiter).

Minor ocular (eye) signs, which may be present in any type of hyperthyroidism, are eyelid retraction ("stare"), extraocular muscle weakness, and lid-lag. In hyperthyroid stare (Dalrymple sign) the eyelids are retracted upward more than normal (the normal position is at the superior corneoscleral limbus, where the "white" of the eye begins at the upper border of the iris). Extraocular muscle weakness may present with double vision. In lid-lag (von Graefe's sign), when the person tracks an object downward with their eyes, the eyelid fails to follow the downward moving iris, and the same type of upper globe exposure which is seen with lid retraction occurs, temporarily. These signs disappear with treatment of the hyperthyroidism.

Neither of these ocular signs should be confused with exophthalmos (protrusion of the eyeball), which occurs specifically and uniquely in hyperthyroidism caused by Graves' disease (note that not all exophthalmos is caused by Graves' disease, but when present with hyperthyroidism is diagnostic of Graves' disease). This forward protrusion of the eyes is due to immune-mediated inflammation in the retro-orbital (eye socket) fat. Exophthalmos, when present, may exacerbate hyperthyroid lid-lag and stare.

Thyroid storm

Thyroid storm is a severe form of thyrotoxicosis characterized by rapid and often irregular heart beat, high temperature, vomiting, diarrhea, and mental agitation. Symptoms may not be typical in the young, old, or pregnant. It usually occurs due to untreated hyperthyroidism and can be provoked by infections. It is a medical emergency and requires hospital care to control the symptoms rapidly. Even with treatment, death occurs in 20% to 50% of cases.

Hypothyroidism
Hyperthyroidism due to certain types of thyroiditis can eventually lead to hypothyroidism (a lack of thyroid hormone), as the thyroid gland is damaged. Also, radioiodine treatment of Graves' disease often eventually leads to hypothyroidism. Such hypothyroidism may be diagnosed with thyroid hormone testing and treated by oral thyroid hormone supplementation.

Causes

There are several causes of hyperthyroidism. Most often, the entire gland is overproducing thyroid hormone. Less commonly, a single nodule is responsible for the excess hormone secretion, called a "hot" nodule. Thyroiditis (inflammation of the thyroid) can also cause hyperthyroidism. Functional thyroid tissue producing an excess of thyroid hormone occurs in a number of clinical conditions.

The major causes in humans are:
 Graves' disease. An autoimmune disease (usually, the most common cause with 50–80% worldwide, although this varies substantially with location- i.e., 47% in Switzerland (Horst et al., 1987) to 90% in the USA (Hamburger et al. 1981)). Thought to be due to varying levels of iodine in the diet. It is eight times more common in females than males and often occurs in young females, around 20 – 40 years of age.
 Toxic thyroid adenoma (the most common cause in Switzerland, 53%, thought to be atypical due to a low level of dietary iodine in this country)
 Toxic multinodular goiter
High blood levels of thyroid hormones (most accurately termed hyperthyroxinemia) can occur for a number of other reasons:
 Inflammation of the thyroid is called thyroiditis. There are several different kinds of thyroiditis including Hashimoto's thyroiditis (Hypothyroidism immune-mediated), and subacute thyroiditis (de Quervain's). These may be initially associated with secretion of excess thyroid hormone but usually progress to gland dysfunction and, thus, to hormone deficiency and hypothyroidism.
 Oral consumption of excess thyroid hormone tablets is possible (surreptitious use of thyroid hormone), as is the rare event of eating ground beef or pork contaminated with thyroid tissue, and thus thyroid hormones (termed hamburger thyrotoxicosis or alimentary thyrotoxicosis). Pharmacy compounding errors may also be a cause.
 Amiodarone, an antiarrhythmic drug, is structurally similar to thyroxine and may cause either under-or overactivity of the thyroid.
 Postpartum thyroiditis (PPT) occurs in about 7% of women during the year after they give birth. PPT typically has several phases, the first of which is hyperthyroidism. This form of hyperthyroidism usually corrects itself within weeks or months without the need for treatment.
 A struma ovarii is a rare form of monodermal teratoma that contains mostly thyroid tissue, which leads to hyperthyroidism.
 Excess iodine consumption notably from algae such as kelp.

Thyrotoxicosis can also occur after taking too much thyroid hormone in the form of supplements, such as levothyroxine (a phenomenon known as exogenous thyrotoxicosis, alimentary thyrotoxicosis, or occult factitial thyrotoxicosis).

Hypersecretion of thyroid stimulating hormone (TSH), which in turn is almost always caused by a pituitary adenoma, accounts for much less than 1 percent of hyperthyroidism cases.

Diagnosis
Measuring the level of thyroid-stimulating hormone (TSH), produced by the pituitary gland (which in turn is also regulated by the hypothalamus's TSH Releasing Hormone) in the blood is typically the initial test for suspected hyperthyroidism. A low TSH level typically indicates that the pituitary gland is being inhibited or "instructed" by the brain to cut back on stimulating the thyroid gland, having sensed increased levels of T4 and/or T3 in the blood. In rare circumstances, a low TSH indicates primary failure of the pituitary, or temporary inhibition of the pituitary due to another illness (euthyroid sick syndrome) and so checking the T4 and T3 is still clinically useful.

Measuring specific antibodies, such as anti-TSH-receptor antibodies in Graves' disease, or anti-thyroid peroxidase in Hashimoto's thyroiditis—a common cause of hypothyroidism—may also contribute to the diagnosis. The diagnosis of hyperthyroidism is confirmed by blood tests that show a decreased thyroid-stimulating hormone (TSH) level and elevated T4 and T3 levels. TSH is a hormone made by the pituitary gland in the brain that tells the thyroid gland how much hormone to make. When there is too much thyroid hormone, the TSH will be low. A radioactive iodine uptake test and thyroid scan together characterizes or enables radiologists and doctors to determine the cause of hyperthyroidism. The uptake test uses radioactive iodine injected or taken orally on an empty stomach to measure the amount of iodine absorbed by the thyroid gland. Persons with hyperthyroidism absorb much more iodine than healthy persons which includes radioactive iodine which is easy to measure.  A thyroid scan producing images is typically conducted in connection with the uptake test to allow visual examination of the over-functioning gland.

Thyroid scintigraphy is a useful test to characterize (distinguish between causes of) hyperthyroidism, and this entity from thyroiditis. This test procedure typically involves two tests performed in connection with each other: an iodine uptake test and a scan (imaging) with a gamma camera. The uptake test involves administering a dose of radioactive iodine (radioiodine), traditionally iodine-131 (131I), and more recently iodine-123 (123I). Iodine-123 may be the preferred radionuclide in some clinics due to its more favorable radiation dosimetry (i.e. less radiation dose to the person per unit administered radioactivity) and a gamma photon energy more amenable to imaging with the gamma camera. For the imaging scan, I-123 is considered an almost ideal isotope of iodine for imaging thyroid tissue and thyroid cancer metastasis.

Typical administration involves a pill or liquid containing sodium iodide (NaI) taken orally, which contains a small amount of iodine-131, amounting to perhaps less than a grain of salt. A 2-hour fast of no food prior to and for 1 hour after ingesting the pill is required. This low dose of radioiodine is typically tolerated by individuals otherwise allergic to iodine (such as those unable to tolerate contrast mediums containing larger doses of iodine such as used in CT scan, intravenous pyelogram (IVP), and similar imaging diagnostic procedures). Excess radioiodine that does not get absorbed into the thyroid gland is eliminated by the body in urine. Some people with hyperthyroidism may experience a slight allergic reaction to the diagnostic radioiodine and may be given an antihistamine.

The person returns 24 hours later to have the level of radioiodine "uptake" (absorbed by the thyroid gland) measured by a device with a metal bar placed against the neck, which measures the radioactivity emitting from the thyroid. This test takes about 4 minutes while the uptake % (i.e., percentage) is accumulated (calculated) by the machine software. A scan is also performed, wherein images (typically a center, left and right angle) are taken of the contrasted thyroid gland with a gamma camera; a radiologist will read and prepare a report indicating the uptake % and comments after examining the images. People with hyperthyroid will typically "take up" higher than normal levels of radioiodine. Normal ranges for RAI uptake are from 10 to 30%.

In addition to testing the TSH levels, many doctors test for T3, Free T3, T4, and/or Free T4 for more detailed results. Free T4 is unbound to any protein in the blood. Adult limits for these hormones are: TSH (units): 0.45 – 4.50 uIU/mL; T4 Free/Direct (nanograms): 0.82 – 1.77 ng/dl; and T3 (nanograms): 71 – 180 ng/dl. Persons with hyperthyroidism can easily exhibit levels many times these upper limits for T4 and/or T3. See a complete table of normal range limits for thyroid function at the thyroid gland article.

In hyperthyroidism CK-MB (Creatine kinase) is usually elevated.

Subclinical

In overt primary hyperthyroidism, TSH levels are low and T4 and T3 levels are high. Subclinical hyperthyroidism is a milder form of hyperthyroidism characterized by low or undetectable serum TSH level, but with a normal serum free thyroxine level. Although the evidence for doing so is not definitive, treatment of elderly persons having subclinical hyperthyroidism could reduce the number of cases of atrial fibrillation. There is also an increased risk of bone fractures (by 42%) in people with subclinical hyperthyroidism; there is insufficient evidence to say whether treatment with antithyroid medications would reduce that risk.

A 2022 meta-analysis found subclinical hyperthyroidism to be associated with cardiovascular death.

Screening
In those without symptoms who are not pregnant there is little evidence for or against screening.

Treatment

Antithyroid drugs
Thyrostatics (antithyroid drugs) are drugs that inhibit the production of thyroid hormones, such as carbimazole (used in the UK) and methimazole (used in the US, Germany and Russia), and propylthiouracil. Thyrostatics are believed to work by inhibiting the iodination of thyroglobulin by thyroperoxidase and, thus, the formation of tetraiodothyronine (T4). Propylthiouracil also works outside the thyroid gland, preventing the conversion of (mostly inactive) T4 to the active form T3. Because thyroid tissue usually contains a substantial reserve of thyroid hormone, thyrostatics can take weeks to become effective and the dose often needs to be carefully titrated over a period of months, with regular doctor visits and blood tests to monitor results.

A very high dose is often needed early in treatment, but, if too high a dose is used persistently, people can develop symptoms of hypothyroidism. This titrating of the dose is difficult to do accurately, and so sometimes a "block and replace" attitude is taken. In block and replace treatments thyrostatics are taken in sufficient quantities to completely block thyroid hormones, and the person treated as though they have complete hypothyroidism.

Beta-blockers
Many of the common symptoms of hyperthyroidism such as palpitations, trembling, and anxiety are mediated by increases in beta-adrenergic receptors on cell surfaces. Beta blockers, typically used to treat high blood pressure, are a class of drugs that offset this effect, reducing rapid pulse associated with the sensation of palpitations, and decreasing tremor and anxiety. Thus, a person with hyperthyroidism can often obtain immediate temporary relief until the hyperthyroidism can be characterized with the Radioiodine test noted above and more permanent treatment take place. Note that these drugs do not treat hyperthyroidism or any of its long-term effects if left untreated, but, rather, they treat or reduce only symptoms of the condition.

Some minimal effect on thyroid hormone production however also comes with propranolol—which has two roles in the treatment of hyperthyroidism, determined by the different isomers of propranolol. L-propranolol causes beta-blockade, thus treating the symptoms associated with hyperthyroidism such as tremor, palpitations, anxiety, and heat intolerance. D-propranolol inhibits thyroxine deiodinase, thereby blocking the conversion of T4 to T3, providing some though minimal therapeutic effect. Other beta-blockers are used to treat only the symptoms associated with hyperthyroidism. Propranolol in the UK, and metoprolol in the US, are most frequently used to augment treatment for people with hyperthyroid .

Diet
People with autoimmune hyperthyroidism (such as in Grave's disease) should not eat foods high in iodine, such as edible seaweed and kelps.

From a public health perspective, the general introduction of iodized salt in the United States in 1924 resulted in lower disease, goiters, as well as improving the lives of children whose mothers would not have eaten enough iodine during pregnancy which would have lowered the IQs of their children.

Surgery
Surgery (thyroidectomy to remove the whole thyroid or a part of it) is not extensively used because most common forms of hyperthyroidism are quite effectively treated by the radioactive iodine method, and because there is a risk of also removing the parathyroid glands, and of cutting the recurrent laryngeal nerve, making swallowing difficult, and even simply generalized staphylococcal infection as with any major surgery. Some people with Graves' may opt for surgical intervention. This includes those that cannot tolerate medicines for one reason or another, people that are allergic to iodine, or people that refuse radioiodine.

A 2019 systematic review concluded that the available evidence shows no difference between visually identifying the nerve or utilizing intraoperative neuroimaging during surgery, when trying to prevent injury to recurrent laryngeal nerve during thyroid surgery.

If people have toxic nodules treatments typically include either removal or injection of the nodule with alcohol.

Radioiodine
In iodine-131 (radioiodine) radioisotope therapy, which was first pioneered by Dr. Saul Hertz, radioactive iodine-131 is given orally (either by pill or liquid) on a one-time basis, to severely restrict, or altogether destroy the function of a hyperactive thyroid gland. This isotope of radioactive iodine used for ablative treatment is more potent than diagnostic radioiodine (usually iodine-123 or a very low amount of iodine-131), which has a biological half-life from 8–13 hours. Iodine-131, which also emits beta particles that are far more damaging to tissues at short range, has a half-life of approximately 8 days.  People not responding sufficiently to the first dose are sometimes given an additional radioiodine treatment, at a larger dose. Iodine-131 in this treatment is picked up by the active cells in the thyroid and destroys them, rendering the thyroid gland mostly or completely inactive.

Since iodine is picked up more readily (though not exclusively) by thyroid cells, and (more important) is picked up even more readily by over-active thyroid cells, the destruction is local, and there are no widespread side effects with this therapy. Radioiodine ablation has been used for over 50 years, and the only major reasons for not using it are pregnancy and breastfeeding (breast tissue also picks up and concentrates iodine). Once the thyroid function is reduced, replacement hormone therapy (levothyroxine) taken orally each day replaces the thyroid hormone that is normally produced by the body.

There is extensive experience, over many years, of the use of radioiodine in the treatment of thyroid overactivity and this experience does not indicate any increased risk of thyroid cancer following treatment. However, a study from 2007 has reported an increased number of cancer cases after radioiodine treatment for hyperthyroidism.

The principal advantage of radioiodine treatment for hyperthyroidism is that it tends to have a much higher success rate than medications. Depending on the dose of radioiodine chosen, and the disease under treatment (Graves' vs. toxic goiter, vs. hot nodule etc.), the success rate in achieving definitive resolution of the hyperthyroidism may vary from 75 to 100%. A major expected side-effect of radioiodine in people with Graves' disease is the development of lifelong hypothyroidism, requiring daily treatment with thyroid hormone. On occasion, some people may require more than one radioactive treatment, depending on the type of disease present, the size of the thyroid, and the initial dose administered.

People with Graves' disease manifesting moderate or severe Graves' ophthalmopathy are cautioned against radioactive iodine-131 treatment, since it has been shown to exacerbate existing thyroid eye disease. People with mild or no ophthalmic symptoms can mitigate their risk with a concurrent six-week course of prednisone. The mechanisms proposed for this side effect involve a TSH receptor common to both thyrocytes and retro-orbital tissue.

As radioactive iodine treatment results in the destruction of thyroid tissue, there is often a transient period of several days to weeks when the symptoms of hyperthyroidism may actually worsen following radioactive iodine therapy. In general, this happens as a result of thyroid hormones being released into the blood following the radioactive iodine-mediated destruction of thyroid cells that contain thyroid hormone. In some people, treatment with medications such as beta blockers (propranolol, atenolol, etc.) may be useful during this period of time. Most people do not experience any difficulty after the radioactive iodine treatment, usually given as a small pill. On occasion, neck tenderness or a sore throat may become apparent after a few days, if moderate inflammation in the thyroid develops and produces discomfort in the neck or throat area. This is usually transient, and not associated with a fever, etc.

It is recommended that breastfeeding be stopped at least six weeks before radioactive iodine treatment and that it not be resumed, although it can be done in future pregnancies. It also shouldn't be done during pregnancy, and pregnancy should be put off until at least 6–12 months after treatment.

A common outcome following radioiodine is a swing from hyperthyroidism to the easily treatable hypothyroidism, which occurs in 78% of those treated for Graves' thyrotoxicosis and in 40% of those with toxic multinodular goiter or solitary toxic adenoma. Use of higher doses of radioiodine reduces the number of cases of treatment failure, with penalty for higher response to treatment consisting mostly of higher rates of eventual hypothyroidism which requires hormone treatment for life.

There is increased sensitivity to radioiodine therapy in thyroids appearing on ultrasound scans as more uniform (hypoechogenic), due to densely packed large cells, with 81% later becoming hypothyroid, compared to just 37% in those with more normal scan appearances (normoechogenic).

Thyroid storm
Thyroid storm presents with extreme symptoms of hyperthyroidism.  It is treated aggressively with resuscitation measures along with a combination of the above modalities including: an intravenous beta blockers such as propranolol, followed by a thioamide such as methimazole, an iodinated radiocontrast agent or an iodine solution if the radiocontrast agent is not available, and an intravenous steroid such as hydrocortisone.

Alternative medicine 
In countries such as China, herbs used alone or with antithyroid medications are used to treat hyperthyroidism. Very low quality evidence suggests that traditional Chinese herbal medications may be beneficial when taken along with routine hyperthyroid medications, however, there is no reliable evidence to determine the effectiveness of Chinese herbal medications for treating hyperthyroidism.

Epidemiology
In the United States hyperthyroidism affects about 1.2% of the population. About half of these cases have obvious symptoms while the other half do not. It occurs between two and ten times more often in women. The disease is more common in those over the age of 60 years.

Subclinical hyperthyroidism modestly increases the risk of cognitive impairment and dementia.

History 
Caleb Hillier Parry first made the association between the goiter and protrusion of the eyes in 1786, however, did not publish his findings until 1825. In 1835, Irish doctor Robert James Graves discovered a link between the protrusion of the eyes and goiter, giving his name to the autoimmune disease now known as Graves' Disease.

Pregnancy

Recognizing and evaluating hyperthyroidism in pregnancy is a diagnostic challenge. Thyroid hormones are naturally elevated during pregnancy. Thyroid function generally normalizes in by the second trimester without treatment. Hyperthyroidism must also be distinguished from gestational transient thyrotoxicosis; as it can increase the risk of complications for mother and child. Such risks include pregnancy-related hypertension, pregnancy loss, low-birth weight, still birth and behavioral disorders later in the child's life. Nonetheless, high maternal FT4 levels during pregnancy have been associated with impaired brain developmental outcomes of the offspring and this was independent of for example hCG levels.

Other animals

Cats
Hyperthyroidism is one of the most common endocrine conditions affecting older domesticated housecats. In the United States, up to 10% of cats over ten years old have hyperthyroidism. The disease has become significantly more common since the first reports of feline hyperthyroidism in the 1970s. The most common cause of hyperthyroidism in cats is the presence of benign tumors called adenomas. 98% of cases are caused by the presence of an adenoma, but the reason these cats develop such tumors continues to be studied.

The most common presenting symptoms are: rapid weight loss, tachycardia (rapid heart rate), vomiting, diarrhea, increased consumption of fluids (polydipsia), increased appetite (polyphagia), and increased urine production (polyuria). Other symptoms include hyperactivity, possible aggression, an unkempt appearance, and large, thick claws. Heart murmurs and a gallop rhythm can develop due to secondary hypertrophic cardiomyopathy.  About 70% of affected cats also have enlarged thyroid glands (goiter). 10% of cats exhibit "apathetic hyperthyroidism", which is characterized by anorexia and lethargy.

The same three treatments used with humans are also options in treating feline hyperthyroidism (surgery, radioiodine treatment, and anti-thyroid drugs). There is also a special low iodine diet available that will control the symptoms providing no other food is fed; Hill's y/d formula, when given exclusively, decreases T4 production by limiting the amount of iodine needed for thyroid hormone production. It is the only available commercial diet that focuses on managing feline hyperthyroidism. Medical and dietary management using methimazole and Hill's y/d cat food will give hyperthyroid cats an average of 2 years before dying due to secondary conditions such as heart and kidney failure. Drugs used to help manage the symptoms of hyperthyroidism are methimazole and carbimazole. Drug therapy is the least expensive option, even though the drug must be administered daily for the remainder of the cat's life. Carbimazole is only available as a once daily tablet. Methimazole is available as an oral solution, a tablet, and compounded as a topical gel that is applied using a finger cot to the hairless skin inside a cat's ear. Many cat owners find this gel a good option for cats that don't like being given pills.

Radioiodine treatment, however, is not available in all areas, as this treatment requires nuclear radiological expertise and facilities that not only board the cat, but are specially equipped to manage the cat's urine, sweat, saliva, and stool, which are radioactive for several days after the treatment, usually for a total of 3 weeks (the cat spends the first week in total isolation and the next two weeks in close confinement). In the United States, the guidelines for radiation levels vary from state to state; some states such as Massachusetts allow hospitalization for as little as two days before the animal is sent home with care instructions.

Dogs
Hyperthyroidism is much less common in dogs compared to cats. Hyperthyroidism may be caused by a thyroid tumor. This may be a thyroid carcinoma. About 90% of carcinomas are very aggressive; they invade the surrounding tissues and metastasize (spread) to other tissues, particularly the lungs. This has a poor prognosis. Surgery to remove the tumor is often very difficult due to metastasis into arteries, the esophagus, or the windpipe. It may be possible to reduce the size of the tumor, thus relieving symptoms and allowing time for other treatments to work. About 10% of thyroid tumors are benign; these often cause few symptoms.

In dogs treated for hypothyroidism (lack of thyroid hormone), iatrogenic hyperthyroidism may occur as a result of an overdose of the thyroid hormone replacement medication, levothyroxine; in this case, treatment involves reducing the dose of levothyroxine. Dogs which display coprophagy, the consumption of feces, and also live in a household with a dog receiving levothyroxine treatment, may develop hyperthyroidism if they frequently eat the feces from the dog receiving levothyroxine treatment.

Hyperthyroidism may occur if a dog eats an excessive amount of thyroid gland tissue. This has occurred in dogs fed commercial dog food.

See also 
 High-output cardiac failure
 Jod-Basedow phenomenon
 Hashitoxicosis

Further reading 

 2016 American Thyroid Association Guidelines for Diagnosis and Management of Hyperthyroidism and Other Causes of Thyrotoxicosis, Thyroid. Oct 2016.1343-1421.

References

Further reading

External links 
 Merck Manual article about hyperthyroidism
 

Thyroid disease
Endocrine-related cutaneous conditions
Dog diseases
Thyroid
Cat diseases
Wikipedia medicine articles ready to translate
Wikipedia emergency medicine articles ready to translate